A partial solar eclipse occurred on November 10, 1920. A solar eclipse occurs when the Moon passes between Earth and the Sun, thereby totally or partly obscuring the image of the Sun for a viewer on Earth. A partial solar eclipse occurs in the polar regions of the Earth when the center of the Moon's shadow misses the Earth.

Related eclipses

Solar eclipses 1916–1920

Notes

References

External links 

1920 11 10
1920 in science
1920 11 10
November 1920 events